Aleksei Yevgenyevich Domshinskiy (born 9 January 1990) is a Russian former football forward.

Club career
He made his debut in the Russian Second Division for FC Torpedo Armavir on 26 April 2013 in a game against FC Slavyansky Slavyansk-na-Kubani.

He made his Russian Football National League debut for FC Sokol Saratov on 11 July 2016 in a game against FC Zenit-2 Saint Petersburg. 2016 was his only season in the FNL so far.

References

External links
 Career summary by sportbox.ru

1990 births
Sportspeople from Krasnodar
Living people
Russian footballers
Association football forwards
FC Sokol Saratov players
FC Armavir players
FC Neftekhimik Nizhnekamsk players